Profound Mysteries III is the eighth studio album by Norwegian electronic music duo Röyksopp, and is the third and last album in the Profound Mysteries series of albums. The album was released on 18 November 2022. It was released with collections of short films (each by a different director) and animated visualizations (by artist Jonathan Zawada) created to accompany each track.

Background and development

Critical reception

Profound Mysteries III received generally positive reviews from music critics. At Metacritic, which assigns a normalised rating out of 100 to reviews from mainstream publications, the album received an average score of 71, based on 5 reviews.
Thomas Bedenbaugh of Slant Magazine stated that "Röyksopp concludes their Profound Mysteries trilogy with some of their most ambitious songs to date", and further noted that the track "Speed King" is the centerpiece of the album and described that "the song serves as the boldest and most memorable composition in the trilogy." NRK's Shana Fevang Mathai noted that the range of songs might require a "generous ear" to appreciate. Sebas E. Alonso of Jenesaispop praised "the fact that [Röyksopp] offers us something different in this storm of overwhelming news that the music world has become every Friday." Bernt Erik Pedersen of Dagsavisen described the tracks of the album as going "from dramatic heights to quiet introspection, from the low whispering to the grandly symphonic, with both orchestral strings and sweeping synth strings. At the same time, there is light and dewy synthpop [...] with Astrid S on Just Wanted To Know."

Track listing

Accompanying short films
Released between August and November 2022, alongside tracks from Profound Mysteries III.

Charts

References

External links
 Profound Mysteries on the official Röyksopp website

2022 albums
Röyksopp albums
Sequel albums